is a railway station in the city of Gujō, Gifu Prefecture, Japan, operated by the third sector railway operator Nagaragawa Railway.

Lines

Station layout
Hokunō Station has a one ground-level island platform connected to the station building by a level crossing.  An additional siding leads to a disused railway turntable. The station is staffed. The station building houses a small cafe that serves meals of hot noodles. The cafe also sells a small selection of Nagaragawa Railway memorabilia, including crackers and biscuits printed with pictures of the railway.

Adjacent stations

|-
!colspan=5|Nagaragawa Railway

History
Hokunō Station was opened on August 16, 1934. It was extensively used during the construction of the Miboro Dam in 1967 and the Oshirakawa Dam in 1961. Freight operations were discontinued from October 1974. On December 11, 1986, it came under the control of the Nagaragawa Railway.

Surrounding area
Nagara River

See also
 List of Railway Stations in Japan

References

External links

 

Railway stations in Japan opened in 1934
Railway stations in Gifu Prefecture
Stations of Nagaragawa Railway
Gujō, Gifu